OSG.JS
is a WebGL framework based on OpenSceneGraph concepts. It allows an individual to use an “OpenSceneGraph-like” toolbox to interact with WebGL via JavaScript, and provides facilities for exporting various assets to the osgjs format. The API is kept as similar to OpenSceneGraph as possible, providing a familiar environment to veterans of the library and introducing newcomers to a popular and heavily-scrutinzed set of interfaces. OSG.JS was developed and is maintained by Cédric Pinson, and accessible on GitHub.

Actual Version 0.2.7 (26. August 2016)

Selected uses and works 

 Sketchfab
 Cl3ver
 Globe Tweeter
 Nouvelle Vague

See also 
List of WebGL frameworks

References

External links 
 GitHub repository
 WebGL

WebGL